Group D of the 2022 FIFA World Cup took place from 22 to 30 November 2022. The group consisted of reigning world champions France, Australia, Denmark and Tunisia. The top two teams, France and Australia advanced to the round of 16. Australia, Denmark and France were also in Group C of the previous World Cup.

Teams

Notes

Standings

In the round of 16:
 The winners of Group D, France, advanced to play the runners-up of Group C, Poland.
 The runners-up of Group D, Australia, advanced to play the winners of Group C, Argentina.

Matches
All times listed are local, AST (UTC+3).

Denmark vs Tunisia
The two teams had faced each other twice, most recently in 2002, a 2–1 win for Denmark in a friendly game.

Denmark was not able to capitalize in their opening game; although Tunisia failed to score a single goal themselves, Aïssa Laïdouni earned the Man of the Match award for his defensive heroics.

France vs Australia
The two teams had faced each other five times, including once in the World Cup, in France's 2–1 victory in 2018 en route to the title. They also met in Australia's 1–0 win against the reigning world champions (having previously won the 1998 FIFA World Cup) at the 2001 FIFA Confederations Cup.

In the ninth minute Craig Goodwin gave Australia the lead when he finished at the back post high into the net after a low cross from the right by Mathew Leckie. Adrien Rabiot made it 1–1 when he headed to the net from a Théo Hernandez cross from the left. France took the lead five minutes later when Olivier Giroud side footed to the net after a low cross from Rabiot from the left.
In the 68th minute Kylian Mbappé scored with a header from six yards out to the left corner after a cross from Ousmane Dembélé on the right. Giroud got his second with another header after a Mbappé cross from the left to make it 4–1.
Giroud's second goal equalled Thierry Henry's all-time scoring record of 51 goals for France. France's win marked the first time since 2006 that the defending champion won their opening game. On the other hand, Craig Goodwin's goal was the fastest conceded goal for France since the 1982 FIFA World Cup.

French defender Lucas Hernandez suffered a torn ACL after 13 minutes of the match.

Tunisia vs Australia
The two teams had faced each other twice, most recently in Tunisia's 2–0 win at the 2005 FIFA Confederations Cup.

Australia beat Tunisia 1–0 as a result of a Mitchell Duke header in the 23rd minute to secure their first win in a World Cup match since they defeated Serbia 2–1 in 2010. This was also Australia's first clean sheet since they drew 0–0 with Chile in 1974.

France vs Denmark
The teams had met thrice in the World Cup, all in the group stage with three different results; France won 2–1 in 1998, Denmark won 2–0 in 2002 and the teams drew 0–0 in 2018.

France won 2–1 and qualified for the knockout stage, thus becoming the first defending champions since Brazil in 2006 to advance from the group stage. Among European countries, they were the first World Cup holders to qualify for the knockout stage since Germany in 1994.

Australia vs Denmark
The teams had met once in the World Cup, a 1–1 draw in 2018.

Australia won the game 1–0 to finish second in the group. The only goal of the match was scored by Mathew Leckie in the 60th minute with a low left-foot finish to the bottom right corner of the net. This result meant that Australia progressed to the knockout stage for the second time in their World Cup history, the first time since 2006 and the first time they did it as a member of the AFC. This was also the first time that Australia had won two consecutive matches, scored in every group stage game, and kept a clean sheet twice in a World Cup.

Tunisia vs France
The two teams had faced each other four times, most recently in 2010 friendly, a 1–1 draw.

Wahbi Khazri put Tunisia into the lead in the 58th minute with a low shot to the bottom right corner. At that stage, Tunisia was in a position to qualify from the group. However, two minutes later Australia went in front against Denmark in the other match taking place at the same time, which put Tunisia outside of the qualifying positions. In added time, Antoine Griezmann scored to seemingly make it 1–1 with a volley but the goal was ruled out by VAR for offside. Australia went on to beat Denmark, which meant that Tunisia finished third in the group and failed to get into the knockout stage for the sixth consecutive World Cup.

Viewers tuning in to French television for the match missed that the French team had lost the game 1–0. TF1 switched to an ad after Griezmann had seemingly levelled the game late in stoppage time, causing French viewers to miss the pitchside monitor consultation that led VAR to rule that Griezmann had been offside. French football supporters awoke in shock the following morning to belatedly discover that the game had not ended in a tie at all, but in a surprise defeat for the reigning world champions. The incident brought to mind the time British broadcaster ITV cut for an ad break and missed Steven Gerrard scoring England's opening goal at the 2010 FIFA World Cup.

Discipline
Fair play points would have been used as tiebreakers if the overall and head-to-head records of teams were tied. These were calculated based on yellow and red cards received in all group matches as follows:
first yellow card: −1 point;
indirect red card (second yellow card): −3 points;
direct red card: −4 points;
yellow card and direct red card: −5 points;

Only one of the above deductions was applied to a player in a single match.

References

External links

 

2022 FIFA World Cup
France at the 2022 FIFA World Cup
Australia at the 2022 FIFA World Cup
Denmark at the 2022 FIFA World Cup
Tunisia at the 2022 FIFA World Cup